The 1990 United States Senate election in South Dakota was held on November 6, 1990. Incumbent Republican U.S. Senator Larry Pressler ran for re-election to a third term, and narrowly beat Democratic nominee Theodore 'Ted' Muenster by 19,000 votes. This was the last time until 2014 that a Republican would be elected to South Dakota's Class 2 Senate seat.

Candidates

Democratic 
 Theodore 'Ted' Muenster, Former Dean at University of South Dakota, Former Chief of Staff for Governor Kneip

Republican 
 Larry Pressler, incumbent U.S. Senator

Results 

|-

See also 
 1990 United States Senate elections

References

South Dakota
1990
1990 South Dakota elections